Sohil Akhtar Ansari is an Indian politician and a former member of Uttar Pradesh Legislative Assembly. He was elected to 2017 assembly elections from Kanpur Cantt. assembly constituency of Kanpur Nagar district as INC candidate. He was formerly associated with BSP and contested 2012 assembly elections unsuccessfully.

Political career
Ansari has been a member of the 17th Legislative Assembly of Uttar Pradesh. Since 2017, he is representing the Kanpur Cantonment constituency and is a member of the INC.

Posts held

See also
Uttar Pradesh Legislative Assembly

References

Uttar Pradesh MLAs 2017–2022
Indian National Congress politicians from Uttar Pradesh
Living people
1964 births
Bahujan Samaj Party politicians
Indian National Congress politicians from Madhya Pradesh